Castilleja elata is a species of flowering plant in the family Orobanchaceae with the common name Siskiyou paintbrush.

Range
Castilleja elata is native to the Siskiyou Mountains in southern Oregon and northern California.

Habitat
Castilleja elata grows in boggy areas, often on serpentine soils.

References

elata
Flora of California
Flora of Oregon